Juantavius Tavon "J. T." Gray (born January 18, 1996) is an American football safety for the New Orleans Saints of the National Football League (NFL). He played college football at Mississippi State.

Professional career
Gray signed with the New Orleans Saints as an undrafted free agent on May 3, 2018. He played in five games, primarily playing on special teams, before being waived on November 13, 2018 and re-signed to the practice squad. He signed a reserve/future contract with the Saints on January 21, 2019.

In 2019, Gray played in all 16 games as a core special-teamer. He tied for the league-lead with 16 special teams tackles and was named second-team All-Pro as a special teamer.

On March 3, 2021, Gray signed a two-year, $4 million contract extension with the Saints. Gray was elected captain for the 2021 season.

On March 10, 2023, Gray signed a three-year contract extension with the Saints.

References

1996 births
Living people
American football safeties
Mississippi State Bulldogs football players
New Orleans Saints players
Players of American football from Mississippi
Sportspeople from Clarksdale, Mississippi